Ornipholidotos tiassale, the western glasswing, is a butterfly in the family Lycaenidae. It is found in Sierra Leone, Liberia, Ivory Coast and Ghana.

Adults feed on extrafloral nectaries on Marantaceae species.

References

Butterflies described in 1969
Ornipholidotos